BL Lac may refer to:

BL Lacertae, an active galaxy, prototype of the BL Lacertae objects
BL Lacertae object, a type of active galaxy, based on the prototype BL Lacertae galaxy